KNDK (1080 kHz) is an AM radio station broadcasting farm and classic country music programming serving Langdon, North Dakota. The station is currently owned by Simmons Broadcasting. All four Simmons Broadcasting stations share studios at 1403 Third Street in Langdon, ND. It serves as the only American affiliate station of the Winnipeg Jets of the National Hockey League.

1080 AM is a United States clear channel frequency; KOAN, KRLD, and WTIC share Class A status on this frequency.

On May 6, 2022 KNDK replaced the talk portion of its format with farm news and shifted its music to classic country.

References

External links

Classic country radio stations in the United States
NDK
Radio stations established in 1967
1967 establishments in North Dakota
Cavalier County, North Dakota